USCGC Itasca may refer to one of the following United States Coast Guard Cutters:

 
 

United States Coast Guard ship names